Taylor Ball (born December 28, 1987) is an American former actor known for his portrayal of Brian Miller in the television sitcom Still Standing and Eddie in Disney's Eddie's Million Dollar Cook-Off. Ball has also appeared on Walker, Texas Ranger.

Filmography

External links
 

1987 births
American male television actors
Living people
North Central Texas College alumni
Male actors from San Antonio